The United States Navy's Boston class were the first guided missile cruisers in the world.  Both ships in this experimental class were originally  heavy cruisers that had been decommissioned after World War II, but were redesignated as guided missile heavy cruisers (CAGs) and entered refit in 1952.  The lengthy conversion and modernization project (aka SCB 48) involved removing the aft triple 8-inch gun turret and its supporting structure and installation of two twin launchers for Terrier anti-aircraft guided missiles.  The forward two 8-inch gun turrets remained unchanged.  The forward superstructure was modified to include the Terrier's associated radars and electronics, the aft superstructure was completely replaced, and the Baltimore class's two funnels were trunked to one.

Owing to the Boston class's experimental nature, the ships were only partially converted, with a full conversion to be carried out if the new weapon systems were successful. Had the ships been fully converted, the forward 8-inch turrets would have been replaced with additional Terrier launchers. 

In 1968 both Boston-class guided missile heavy cruisers were reclassified back to heavy cruisers (CAs), in part due to the extensive use of their 8-inch guns for shore bombardment during the Vietnam War.  While they had retained their Terrier missiles, the swift advance of technology had made these pioneering weapons obsolete after little more than a dozen years' service, and the ships' main battery were once again their six remaining 8-inch guns in the forward turrets. 

Various proposals for limited modernization or complete reconstruction (including SCB 003.68) were considered but ultimately rejected.  In 1970 both Boston class ships were decommissioned for the final time, eventually struck from the Naval Vessel Register, and sold for scrap.

Ships in class

See also 
 List of cruisers of the United States Navy

References

Notes

Sources

External links

hazegray.org
US Naval Historical Center

Cruiser classes